José Luis Neyra  (1930 – 2019) was a Mexican photographer.

Biography
Neyra was born in 1930 in the former Federal District of Mexico. He began working as a photographer in 1961, focusing on capturing everyday life. From 1964 to 1967 he was a member of the Club Fotografico de Mexico. In 1977 he was a founding member of the Consejo Mexicano de Fotografía (Mexican Council of Photography).

His work is included in the collection of the Museum of Fine Arts Houston and the Rijksmuseum, Amsterdam.

His death on November 6, 2019, was announced by the Mexican minister of Culture.

References

1930 births
2019 deaths
20th-century Mexican photographers
21st-century Mexican photographers
20th-century Mexican male artists
21st-century Mexican male artists
People from Mexico City